Turubu Rural LLG is a local-level government (LLG) of East Sepik Province, Papua New Guinea. Many Marienberg languages are spoken in this LLG.

Wards
01. Mandi (Wiarumus language speakers)
02. Forok
03. Kep (Terebu language and Kaiep language speakers)
04. Suanum / Munjun
05. Samap (Elepi language and Kaiep language speakers)
06. Ibab/Waibab
07. Tring (Kamasau language speakers)
08. Yaugib (Urimo language speakers)
09. Namarep (kumin paio languages)
10. Kinyare
11. Kandai
12. Mundagai
13. Wawat
14. Yamben
15. Mambe (Juwal language speakers)
16. Bungain (Bungain language speakers)
17. Sinambali
18. Manuwara
19. Sir
20. Putanda
21. Parpur

References

Local-level governments of East Sepik Province